Meridiano (Diario Meridiano) is a Venezuelan national daily sports newspaper owned by Bloque De Armas, which also owns the sports network Meridiano Televisión.

References

See also 
 List of newspapers in Venezuela

Meridiano
Meridiano
Sports mass media in Venezuela
Sports newspapers
Publications established in 1969